Magnus Hjalmar Munsterhjelm (19 October 1840 – 2 April 1905) was a Finnish landscape painter.

Biography
Munsterhjelm was born at Toivoniemi Manor of Tuulos, Finland. He was the son of Gustaf Riggert Munsterhjelm (1806-1872) and his wife and Mathilda Charlotta Eleonora von Essen (1818-1895). His father first sent him to the Turku Maritime School. In the early 1860s, he studied art at Düsseldorf with Werner Holmberg (1830-1860) and Oswald Achenbach (1827-1905) and at Karlsruhe under Hans Gude.

His painted landscapes were influenced by the romanticism of the Düsseldorf school, often featuring nature as a mood rather than a realistic subject.
His landscape "October Evening After the First Snowfall" (1883) was purchased by Alexander III in 1885; the painting is now in the Ateneum in Helsinki. Two of his works, "The Evening, in Finland" and "The Night" were displayed at the 1878 Paris Exposition. His work "Evening of the First Spring" was also on display at the 1900 Paris Exposition.

He married Olga Mathilda Tanninen (1856–1929) in 1875. They had four children, one of whom was the sculptor John Munsterhjelm (1879–1925). Munsterhjelm became a member of the Royal Swedish Academy of Fine Arts in 1897. 

He kept being highly productive all the way until his death in 1905 in Helsinki. 

In current times his moonlight paintings are some his most famous and popular.

Works

See also
 Finnish art

References

Literary sources
 

Finnish painters
1840 births
1905 deaths
Swedish-speaking Finns